Marcelo Rodolfo Méndez (born 20 June 1964) is an Argentine professional volleyball coach and former player, playing as a middle blocker during his career. He currently serves as head coach for the Argentina national team and the Polish PlusLiga team, Jastrzębski Węgiel.

Personal life
Marcelo Méndez was born in Buenos Aires and began playing volleyball at the age of 12. He married his wife, María Livia, in 1988, and has two sons who are playing volleyball professionally, Nicolás and Juan.

Career

As a coach
In 2004, Marcelo Méndez became an assistant coach of the Spanish team, CV Pòrtol, and the head coach of the same club in 2005. During his four-year work at the club, his team won three Spanish Champion titles, one Spanish Cup and three Supercups. On the international stage, the team led by Méndez managed to reach the final of the 2006 CEV Cup, losing there to Copra Berni Piacenza.

From 2007 to 2008, he served as head coach for the Spain national team. 

In 2009, he took charge  of Sada Cruzeiro. While being the coach of Sada Cruzeiro for over 10 years, he won three Club World Champion titles, seven South American Club Champion titles and six Brazilian Champion titles what makes him one of the world`s most successful club volleyball coaches. In March 2021, Mendez announced that he is leaving Sada Cruzeiro at the end of the season.

In 2018, he was appointed head coach of the Argentina national team. At the 2020 Summer Olympics, he led Argentina to its second bronze medal in history, having beaten Brazil in a third place match (3–2).

On 28 December 2021, he was appointed new head coach of Asseco Resovia, replacing Alberto Giuliani. Mendez finished his work with Resovia in 2022, and ended the 2021–22 PlusLiga season in fifth place. For the next PlusLiga season, he moved to Jastrzębski Węgiel.

Honours

Clubs
 FIVB Club World Championship
  Betim 2013 – with Sada Cruzeiro
  Betim 2015 – with Sada Cruzeiro
  Betim 2016 – with Sada Cruzeiro

 CSV South American Club Championship
  Linares 2012 – with Sada Cruzeiro
  Belo Horizonte 2014 – with Sada Cruzeiro
  Taubate 2016 – with Sada Cruzeiro
  Montes Claros 2017 – with Sada Cruzeiro
  Montes Claros 2018 – with Sada Cruzeiro
  Belo Horizonte 2019 – with Sada Cruzeiro
  Contagem 2020 – with Sada Cruzeiro

 National championships
 1998/1999  Argentine Championship, with River Plate
 2005/2006  Spanish SuperCup, with CV Pòrtol
 2005/2006  Spanish Cup, with CV Pòrtol
 2005/2006  Spanish Championship, with CV Pòrtol
 2006/2007  Spanish Championship, with CV Pòrtol
 2007/2008  Spanish SuperCup, with CV Pòrtol
 2007/2008  Spanish Championship, with CV Pòrtol
 2008/2009  Spanish SuperCup, with CV Pòrtol
 2011/2012  Brazilian Championship, with Sada Cruzeiro
 2013/2014  Brazilian Cup, with Sada Cruzeiro
 2013/2014  Brazilian Championship, with Sada Cruzeiro
 2014/2015  Brazilian Championship, with Sada Cruzeiro
 2015/2016  Brazilian Cup, with Sada Cruzeiro
 2015/2016  Brazilian SuperCup, with Sada Cruzeiro
 2015/2016  Brazilian Championship, with Sada Cruzeiro
 2016/2017  Brazilian SuperCup, with Sada Cruzeiro
 2016/2017  Brazilian Championship, with Sada Cruzeiro
 2017/2018  Brazilian SuperCup, with Sada Cruzeiro
 2017/2018  Brazilian Cup, with Sada Cruzeiro
 2017/2018  Brazilian Championship, with Sada Cruzeiro
 2018/2019  Brazilian Cup, with Sada Cruzeiro
 2019/2020  Brazilian Cup, with Sada Cruzeiro
 2020/2021  Brazilian Cup, with Sada Cruzeiro
 2022/2023  Polish SuperCup, with Jastrzębski Węgiel

References

External links
 
 
 Coach profile at Volleybox.net
 

Living people
1964 births
Volleyball players from Buenos Aires
Argentine men's volleyball players
Argentine volleyball coaches
Volleyball coaches of international teams
Argentine expatriate sportspeople in Italy
Expatriate volleyball players in Italy
Argentine expatriate sportspeople in Spain
Argentine expatriate sportspeople in Brazil
Argentine expatriate sportspeople in Poland
Resovia (volleyball) coaches
Jastrzębski Węgiel coaches
Middle blockers